This is a tentative list of butterflies found in Maine, a state in the United States.

Brush-footed butterflies (Nymphalidae)

Admirals and relatives (Limenitidinae)
'Astyanax' red-spotted purple (Limenitis arthemis astyanax)
Red-spotted purple (Limenitis arthemis)
Viceroy (Limenitis archippus)
White admiral (Limenitis arthemis arthemis) *

Longwings (Heliconiinae)
Aphrodite fritillary (Speyeria aphrodite)
Arctic fritillary (Boloria chariclea)
Atlantis fritillary (Speyeria atlantis)
Bog fritillary (Boloria eunomia)
Great spangled fritillary (Speyeria cybele) *
Meadow fritillary (Boloria bellona)
Regal fritillary (Speyeria idalia)
Silver-bordered fritillary (Boloria selene)
Variegated fritillary (Euptoieta claudia)

Milkweed butterflies (Danainae)
Monarch (Danaus plexippus) *

Snouts (Libytheinae)
American snout (Libytheana carinenta)

True brushfoots (Nymphalinae)
American lady (Vanessa virginiensis)
Baltimore (Euphydryas phaeton)
Common buckeye (Junonia coenia)
Compton tortoiseshell (Nymphalis vaualbum)
Eastern comma (Polygonia comma)
Gray comma (Polygonia progne)
Green comma (Polygonia faunus)
Harris' checkerspot (Chlosyne harrisii)
Hoary comma (Polygonia gracilis)
Milbert's tortoiseshell (Aglais milberti)
Mourning cloak (Nymphalis antiopa) *
Northern crescent (Phyciodes cocyta)
Painted lady (Vanessa cardui)
Pearl crescent (Phyciodes tharos)
Question mark (Polygonia interrogationis)
Red admiral (Vanessa atalanta) *
Satyr comma (Polygonia satyrus)
Silvery checkerspot (Chlosyne nycteis)
Tawny crescent (Phyciodes batesii)

Parnassians and swallowtails (Papilionidae)

Swallowtails (Papilioninae)
Black swallowtail (Papilio polyxenes) *
Canadian tiger swallowtail (Papilio canadensis)
Eastern tiger swallowtail (Papilio glaucus) *
Giant swallowtail (Papilio cresphontes)
Pipevine swallowtail (Battus philenor)
Spicebush swallowtail (Papilio troilus)

Skippers (Hesperiidae)

Spread-wing skippers (Pyrginae)
Common sootywing (Pholisora catullus)
Dreamy duskywing (Erynnis icelus)
Juvenal's duskywing (Erynnis juvenalis)
Northern cloudywing (Thorybes pylades)
Persius duskywing (Erynnis persius)
Silver-spotted skipper (Epargyreus clarus)
Sleepy duskywing (Erynnis brizo)
Southern cloudywing (Thorybes bathyllus)

Gossamer-winged butterflies (Lycaenidae)
Spring azure (Celastrina ladon) *

Harvesters (Miletinae)
Harvester (Feniseca tarquinius)

* most common species

References

Lists of butterflies and moths of the United States
Lists of fauna of Maine